USS Triana (IX-223), an unclassified miscellaneous vessel, was the second ship of the United States Navy to be named for Rodrigo de Triana, the discoverer of the Americas.

Construction
Triana was laid down on 27 December 1943, under a Maritime Commission contract, MC hull No. 2559, as the Liberty ship SS Elinor Wylie,  by California Shipbuilding Corporation, Terminal Island, Los Angeles, California, for the McCormick Steamship Lines; launched on 24 January 1944; sponsored by Mrs. William O'Brien; renamed Triana on 21 May 1945; acquired by the Navy from the War Shipping Administration (WSA) on a "bare-boat" basis on 24 May 194; and commissioned at Pearl Harbor the same day.

Service history
The ship had been severely damaged by an underwater explosion in 1944, and was not considered seaworthy when fully loaded. Nevertheless, during the period 24 May to 29 July, she was patched up, strengthened, and converted into a floating storage ship by the Pearl Harbor Navy Yard.

On 30 July, Triana got underway for the Marshall Islands and arrived at Eniwetok on 11 August. One of her holds was consigned to fleet freight, and the remaining cargo space was utilized for drum storage. The leaks were temporarily stopped, and the ship continued to receive and discharge fleet freight and drum lubricating oil until 30 November.

On 1 December, Triana got underway for Guam to unload 8,896 drums of lubricating oil. She arrived at Apra Harbor on 5 December, and departed for the United States on 24 December 1945. The cargo ship arrived at San Francisco, California, on 15 January 1946, to prepare for inactivation. Triana was decommissioned and returned to the War Shipping Administration on 21 February 1946 and struck from the Naval Vessel Register on 12 March 1946.

Fate
She was placed in the National Defense Reserve Fleet, Suisun Bay Group. In a 17 October 1951, Fleet Report it was recommended that she be scrapped because of the torpedo damage she had incurred during the war, it was estimated that it would cost less than $100,000 to repair her. She was purchased by the Lerner Company, on 12 September 1958, for $73,640. She was physically removed from the Reserve Fleet on 1 October 1958.

Notes 

Citations

Bibliography 

Online resources

External links
 

Liberty ships
Ships built in Los Angeles
Unclassified miscellaneous vessels of the United States Navy
1944 ships
Suisun Bay Reserve Fleet